The 100 metres distance for women in the 2008–09 ISU Speed Skating World Cup was contested over four races on four occasions, out of a total of nine World Cup occasions for the season, with the first occasion involving the distance taking place in Changchun, China, on 6–7 December 2008, and the final occasion taking place in Salt Lake City, United States, on 6–7 March 2009.

Jenny Wolf of Germany successfully defended her title, while Thijsje Oenema of the Netherlands came second, and Xing Aihua of China came third.

Top three

Race medallists

Final standings
Standings as of 8 March 2009 (end of the season).

References

Women 0100
ISU